As Aventuras da Turma da Mônica is a 1982 Brazilian animated anthology film directed by Mauricio de Sousa, based on his Monica's Gang comic books. This was the first feature film based on Monica's Gang and which began production of the cartoon series based on the comics.

The film mixes animation with some scenes made in live-action interpreted by Mauricio de Sousa in his studio. The film shows four individual stories that end up linking through the characters interacting with Mauricio through phone calls.

Distributed by Embrafilme, the film was released theatrically in São Paulo on 23 December 1982 and in Rio de Janeiro on 10 January 1983.

Plot
The film begins with a live-action sequence focusing on Mauricio de Sousa working at his desk until he starts receiving phone calls from his characters—Monica, Jimmy Five, Smudge, Maggy, Franklin and Blu (at the same time that Sousa also talks to the viewer presenting each of the characters)—who have just discovered that they would appear in a film.

While Sousa seeks inspiration to create the plot of the film, the film moves into the comics and focuses on the animated characters. The first story follows Jimmy Five and Smudge as they devise several plans to pull a prank on Monica, but all the gadgets created by Jimmy Five eventually backfire against him in a style of humor similar to the Wile E. Coyote and the Road Runner cartoons.

The second story centers on Monica, who attends a costume party at Franklin's house wearing a mouse costume, but is accidentally shrunk by one of Franklin's inventions and befriends a small mouse that falls in love with her.

The third story also focuses on Monica. Feeling rejected by her friends (who are secretly organizing her birthday party), Monica decides to run away from home to live as a hermit in the mountains.

The fourth story is a parody of the Star Wars films, focused on Monica and Jimmy Five. A mysterious robot rabbit is sent to Earth to dominate the planet by orders of his master, Lorde Coelhão. The robot lands in Jimmy Five's bedroom and tries to attack him, but all his attempts fail. The robot is not noticed by Jimmy Five until the two meet Monica and accidentally ends up abducting the two by stealing Monica's stuffed rabbit Samson. Monica ends up being imprisoned in a gift package while Jimmy Five meets Lorde Coelhão and his plan to conquer Earth. Jimmy Five flees into a spaceship, saving Monica and using the spaceship he manages to defeat Lorde Coelhão and his robots.

At the end of the film, Monica and Jimmy Five, still inside the spaceship, land in Sousa's desk, joining Smudge, Maggy, Franklin, Blu and Angel. All the characters wonder about the film which Sousa intended to do, but he says he no longer needs to make the film because it is done, referring indirectly to the stories that the viewer has just watched.

References

1982 films
1982 animated films
1982 comedy films
1982 science fiction films
1980s adventure comedy films
1980s children's adventure films
1980s children's animated films
1980s children's comedy films
1980s children's fantasy films
1980s fantasy adventure films
1980s fantasy comedy films
1980s Portuguese-language films
1980s science fiction adventure films
1980s science fiction comedy films
Animated adventure films
Animated anthology films
Animated comedy films
Animated films about mice
Animated films about rabbits and hares
Animated films based on comics
Animated science fantasy films
Brazilian adventure comedy films
Brazilian animated science fiction films
Brazilian anthology films
Brazilian fantasy comedy films
Brazilian science fiction comedy films
Films about size change
Films with live action and animation
Monica's Gang films